Chukchansi Park, formerly known as Grizzlies Stadium, is a city-owned baseball stadium located in Fresno, California, United States, completed in 2002 as the home for Minor League Baseball's Fresno Grizzlies. The first game was May 1, 2002. Located in downtown Fresno, it was designed to be an anchor in the rehabilitation of the area, as other commercial development is planned in the Central Business District Loop. The ballpark is also used for music concerts, motocross events, and high school football.

History
Upon the 1998 arrival of the Grizzlies minor league baseball team in Fresno, a group of developers proposed building a stadium in downtown Fresno as a permanent home for the club. There was extensive debate over how much money the City of Fresno would contribute to the project. Ultimately the stadium was built entirely with public money and then leased back to the owners of the Grizzlies for 30 years at $1.5 million per year.

The stadium was designed by Populous, the firm responsible for many of today's sports stadiums like Oriole Park at Camden Yards, Petco Park, Comerica Park and Oracle Park in San Francisco. The ballpark features 600 club seats and 32 luxury suites

In September 2006, Chukchansi Gold Resort & Casino, affiliated with the Chukchansi tribe, announced it would be the premier corporate sponsor for Grizzlies Stadium, in a 15-year,  deal.

In August 2011, the stadium served as a filming location for Parental Guidance. During the game, Billy Crystal threw out the first pitch in character and later appeared on the Grizzlies radio broadcast for an inning.

One of the stadium's most popular events is an annual "taco truck throwdown" where food trucks compete for best taco according to the event's judges. Based on the event, the team designed and wore taco-oriented jerseys.

Attendance records
The stadium's attendance record was set on July 10, 2015 when Chukchansi Park hosted an exhibition soccer game between Mexican soccer clubs Chivas and Atlas, in front of 16,824 fans. The stadium's second attendance record was set on June 27, 2012 when Chukchansi Park hosted an exhibition soccer game between Mexican soccer clubs América and Chiapas of the Primera División, in front of a crowd of 16,125 fans; breaking the previous record set on March 26, 2008 when the Grizzlies played their parent club, the San Francisco Giants, in an exhibition game in front of 14,084 fans.

On March 27, 2015, Liga MX teams Cruz Azul and León faced off an international friendly match in front of a crowd of 15,087 spectators, the third largest crowd recorded at Chukchansi Park.

On May 11, 2012, the Grizzlies fell to the Iowa Cubs in front of 14,023 fans, which is the largest regular season crowd in franchise history.

Gallery

See also
 Save Mart Center
 Selland Arena

References

External links

 Fresno Grizzlies – Chukchansi Park
 Chukchansi Park Views – Ball Parks of the Minor Leagues

Buildings and structures completed in 2002
Baseball venues in California
Minor league baseball venues
Sports venues in Fresno, California
Fresno Grizzlies
2002 establishments in California
Soccer venues in California
Populous (company) buildings
California League ballparks